Andrej Dojkic  is a Croatian actor. His first official screen part was in the 2005 TV series Forbidden Love followed by the 2007 TV series drama Dobre namjere (Good Intentions). He then went on to do a number of theater plays, movies and TV series. He received The Chancellors Award in 2007 for his interpretation of Orpheus in Eurydice during the Dubrovnik Summer Festival. His popularity further increased from his role as Andrija Golubić in Čista ljubav (Pure Love). 

He has a daughter named Nicole with Ines Cvjetović, a woman from Dubrovnik.

Filmography

Television

Film

References

External links

Andrej Dojkic, Official website

Living people
21st-century Croatian male actors
Croatian male film actors
Croatian male television actors
Place of birth missing (living people)
Year of birth missing (living people)